Baham, also rendered Mbahaam, is a Papuan language spoken on the Bomberai Peninsula. It is closely related to the Iha language.

Distribution
Locations within Fak-Fak Regency:

Fak-Fak Barat District: Werba, Wayati, Kwama, Kotam, Wanbar, Waserat, Sangram, Urat, Kriabisa, Tunas Gain, Saharei, Weni, Kinam, Kirawaswas, Wabu, Was
Fak-Fak Timur District
Kokas District

Pronouns
Baham pronouns (Flassy et al. 1987)

References

Further reading

 

Languages of western New Guinea
West Bomberai languages